Katie Cariad Lloyd (born 21 August 1982) is a British comedian, actress, writer, and podcaster who has been performing since 2007. She is a member of the improvisational comedy group Austentatious, the host and creator of Griefcast, and an improv teacher.

Lloyd was nominated in 2011 for Best Newcomer at the Fosters Edinburgh Comedy Awards for her debut solo show, Lady Cariad's Characters. She also won the Edtwinge award for most positively tweeted-about show during the Fringe.  Griefcast has won several awards, including best Entertainment Podcast and Podcast of the Year at the British Podcast Awards and an ARIA Award for Best Podcast.

Early life
Lloyd was born in North London. She is of Welsh descent on her father’s side. He died of pancreatic cancer in 1998, aged 44, when she was 15.

She studied English literature at the University of Sussex, where she first met her friend and fellow comedian Sara Pascoe. Lloyd worked with Pascoe as a tour guide on open-top buses in London.

Career

Television and radio work
Lloyd has performed in numerous sketches on BBC Comedy Online including Funtime (a Dawson Bros. pilot), The Proposal and Dirty Dancing. She has performed for the BBC Radio 4 shows Newsjack, My First Planet, The Now Show, Small Scenes and The Guns of Adam Riches.

Lloyd has appeared on television shows such as Channel 4's Cardinal Burns and CBBC's Fit and DNN and in films such as Baby Cow Productions' Caravan and Film4's Hallo Panda.

She wrote and performed in her own comedy pilot for BBC Three, The Cariad Show. In May 2014, BBC Radio 4 aired a pilot for The Cariad Radio Show, which was featured on the BBC Comedy of the Week podcast. Since 2014, she has been co-writing and performing in the BBC Radio Wales sketch comedy show Here Be Dragons.

In 2014, Lloyd starred as Holly in the BBC Three comedy pilot Vodka Diaries and as Poppy in the comedy series Give Out Girls on Comedy Central. In 2015 she played Dawn, a warden in a young offenders' institution in the BBC Three comedy series Crims. In 2016 she appeared in the initial two episodes of Walliams & Friend on BBC One. She was also a series regular, playing several semi-improvised characters on Murder in Successville with Tom Davis.

Lloyd is a regular panellist on QI, having appeared in 12 episodes as of January 2022. She has also appeared on Have I Got News for You, Would I Lie to You?, The News Quiz and 8 Out of 10 Cats Does Countdown.

She appeared in the final series of Peep Show as Megan.

In 2020, she appeared in Sara Pascoe's comedy series Out of Her Mind for BBC television.

In March 2021, she presented the BBC Radio 4 programme What Have We Learnt About Grief? This programme mentioned the work of Elisabeth Kubler-Ross.

Live performance
Lloyd has performed in a variety of live shows since 2006, including The Freewheelin' Cariad Lloyd at Edinburgh Festival Fringe in 2012. In 2013, she performed in The 50 Hour Improvathon at Hoxton Hall, and The Freewheelin' Cariad Lloyd at Soho Theatre among others. In 2014, she performed at the Edinburgh Fringe with Louise Ford in Cariad and Louise's Character Hour.

Lloyd is a member of the improvisational comedy group Austentatious. In 2014, the show won the Chortle Award for Best Character, Improv or Sketch Act, and two DVDs of one of their live shows have been released by Go Faster Stripe in 2015 and 2018. Other members of the group include Rachel Parris, Amy Cooke-Hodgson and Joseph Morpurgo.

Writing
Lloyd has written a book that deals with personal grief, in her case the death of a parent, her father in 1998 at the age of 44. The Timess review has described her book as, "A blackly funny, honest, thought-provoking and compassionate book that will be of comfort to all who know loss".  

You Are Not Alone, Bloomsbury Publishing, 19 January 2023.

Podcasts
Lloyd created and hosts the podcast Griefcast, a series of conversations about death, bereavement, and coping with the loss of a loved one. It has won several awards,  including: "Best Entertainment Podcast", "Best Interview Podcast" and "Podcast of the Year" at the British Podcast Awards and an ARIA Award for "Podcast of the Year".

Lloyd has appeared on other comedians' podcasts including Pappy's Flatshare Slamdown in 2012, Richard Herring's Leicester Square Theatre Podcast in 2016 and Do the Right Thing in 2017.

Filmography

Television

References

External links

Griefcast 

1982 births
Living people
British television actors
British women comedians
British women writers
British podcasters
British women podcasters